Kevin Michael Reimer (born June 28, 1964) is an American former professional baseball player who played in the Major Leagues primarily as an outfielder and designated hitter from –. He also played two seasons in Japan for the Fukuoka Daiei Hawks in –.

Career
Reimer was drafted by the Texas Rangers in the 11th round of the 1985 Major League Baseball draft. In 1988, Reimer was named the Rangers' Minor League Player of the Year. In , Reimer hit a career-high 20 home runs for the Rangers. Reimer was drafted by the Colorado Rockies from the Texas Rangers as the 9th pick in the 1992 Major League Baseball expansion draft, and promptly traded to Milwaukee Brewers for Dante Bichette.

In his MLB career, Reimer played in 488 games, had 1455 at bats, scored 162 runs, had 376 hits, 52 home runs, 204 runs batted in, a .258 batting average, .320 on-base percentage, and .430 slugging percentage.

On August 24, 1993, Reimer became just the second Brewer (after Johnny Briggs in 1973) to go 6-for-6 in a single game.

Reimer represented Canada at the 1983 Pan American Games and at the 1984 Summer Olympics. In the latter competition, baseball was a demonstration event. He was born in Macon, Georgia while his father, Gerry Reimer, was playing in the minor leagues for the Macon Peaches. As a result of his American birth and Canadian parents, Reimer is a dual citizen. Gerry played in the minors from 1958 to 1968.

Personal
Reimer grew up in Enderby, British Columbia and played for the Enderby Legionaires.

He married Christine, has two daughters and currently lives in British Columbia, Canada.

See also
List of Major League Baseball single-game hits leaders

References

External links

Major League Baseball left fielders
Major League Baseball designated hitters
Baseball players from Georgia (U.S. state)
Sportspeople from Macon, Georgia
American sportspeople of Canadian descent
Texas Rangers players
Milwaukee Brewers players
American expatriate baseball players in Japan
Fukuoka Daiei Hawks players
Tacoma Rainiers players
Salt Lake Buzz players
Salem Redbirds players
Tulsa Drillers players
Burlington Rangers players
Charlotte Rangers players
Oklahoma City 89ers players
People from the Regional District of North Okanagan
1964 births
Living people
Cal State Fullerton Titans baseball players
Baseball players at the 1984 Summer Olympics
Olympic baseball players of Canada
Canadian baseball players
Baseball players at the 1983 Pan American Games
Pan American Games competitors for Canada